The Estonian Song Festival (in Estonian: laulupidu) is one of the largest choral events in the world, a Masterpiece of the Oral and Intangible Heritage of Humanity. It is held every five years in July on the Tallinn Song Festival Grounds (Lauluväljak) simultaneously with the Estonian Dance Festival. The joint choir has comprised more than 30,000 singers performing to an audience of 80,000. 

Almost every Festival features famous Estonian songs "Laul Põhjamaast", "Mu isamaa on minu arm" and the national anthem "Mu isamaa, mu õnn ja rõõm".

History

The tradition of the song festival was born along with Estonian national awakening. The first national song festival was held in Tartu in the summer of 1869. One of the organisers of the first song festival was Johann Voldemar Jannsen. In the first three festivals only men's choirs and brass orchestras participated. 822 singers and 56 brass players participated in the first festival. Starting with the fourth festival, mixed choirs were also participating. Starting with the sixth festival in 1896, the festival tradition moved to Tallinn.

Starting from 1947, the Soviet authorities forced foreign songs into the repertoire. Every event was to include the State Anthem of the Estonian SSR, The Internationale, and the State Anthem of the Soviet Union. Because of the inclusion of children's and boys' choirs the total number of participants rose to 25,000 – 30,000 people. The Dance and Gymnastic Festival of the First Estonian Games started in 1934 became predecessors of later National Dance Festivals accompanying the song festival.

In 2019, the number of visitors to the song festival reached its maximum. Nearly 60,000 tickets were sold from the pre-sale for the XXVII song festival "Minu arm"("My love") concert, and together with the 35,000 singers and musicians participating, a situation had been reached where the pre-sale of tickets was suspended by the decision of the organizers for the safety and security of people.

List of Song Festivals

See also
Latvian Song and Dance Festival
Lithuanian Song Festival
Singing Revolution

References

External links

Official web site
Cultural identity, nationalism and changes in singing traditions by Kristin Kuutma
The Estonian song festival: a chameleon strategy by Evi Arujärv
Estonian Punk Song Festival
To Breathe As One, video about the event
QTVR fullscreen panoramas of the Estonian Song Festival

Masterpieces of the Oral and Intangible Heritage of Humanity
1869 establishments in the Russian Empire
Classical music festivals in Estonia
Music festivals established in 1869
Summer events in Estonia
Music in Tallinn
Culture in Tartu